Graham Rogers may refer to:

 Graham Rogers (footballer), Welsh footballer
 Graham Rogers (actor) (born 1990), American actor

See also
 Graham Rodger (born 1967), Scottish-born English professional footballer and football manager